Yoka or Yōka may refer to
Yoka (name)
Yōka Station, a train station in Hyōgo Prefecture, Japan
Yoka Lokole, a musical band from Zaire 
Guildfordia yoka, a species of deep-water sea snail

See also
Yoko (disambiguation)
Yuka (disambiguation)